Gilbert is a city in Story County, Iowa, United States. The population was 1,211 at the time of the 2020 census. It is part of the Ames, Iowa Metropolitan Statistical Area, which is a part of the larger Ames-Boone, Iowa Combined Statistical Area.

History
Gilbert was named for Hezekiah Gilbert, who owned the land upon which the town was built up.

Geography
Gilbert is located at  (42.105858, -93.645185).

The landscape surrounding the city consists of rolling hills dotted with conventional farm buildings and livestock as well as row crop farming systems. Some suburban-style subdivisions lie a short distance to the south.

Gilbert's southern boundary is two miles north of the Ames boundary that was extended when the Ada Hayden Heritage Park was developed.

Demographics

2010 census
As of the census of 2010, there were 1,082 people, 382 households, and 303 families residing in the city. The racial makeup of the city was 95.3% White, 1.4% African American, 0.2% Native American, 1.1% Asian, 0.8% from other races, and 1.2% from two or more races. Hispanic or Latino of any race were 1.5% of the population.

There were 382 households, of which 49.5% had children under the age of 18 living with them, 67.5% were married couples living together, 9.4% had a female householder with no husband present, 2.4% had a male householder with no wife present, and 20.7% were non-families. 17.3% of all households were made up of individuals, and 4.2% had someone living alone who was 65 years of age or older. The average household size was 2.83 and the average family size was 3.22.

The median age in the city was 34.2 years. 32.4% of residents were under the age of 18; 5.8% were between the ages of 18 and 24; 29.1% were from 25 to 44; 26.2% were from 45 to 64; and 6.4% were 65 years of age or older. The gender makeup of the city was 49.1% male and 50.9% female.

2000 census
As of the census of 2000, there were 987 people, 337 households, and 268 families residing in the city. The racial makeup of the city was 97.06% White, 0.71% African American, 1.52% Asian, 0.20% from other races, and 0.51% from two or more races. Hispanic or Latino of any race were 1.11% of the population.

There were 337 households, out of which 48.1% had children under the age of 18 living with them, 72.7% were married couples living together, 4.7% had a single female head of household, and 20.2% were non-families. 16.0% of all households were made up of individuals, and 4.5% had someone living alone who was 65 years of age or older. The average household size was 2.93 and the average family size was 3.30.

32.1% are under the age of 18, 8.9% from 18 to 24, 33.5% from 25 to 44, 19.0% from 45 to 64, and 6.4% who were 65 years of age or older. The median age was 32 years. For every 100 females, there were 103.1 males. For every 100 females age 18 and over, there were 101.2 males.

The median income for a household in the city was $56,406, and the median income for a family was $61,184. Males had a median income of $35,313 versus $25,083 for females. The per capita income for the city was $19,741. About 1.1% of families and 2.4% of the population were below the poverty line, including 1.3% of those under age 18 and 2.9% of those age 65 or over.

Education

The Gilbert area is served by Gilbert Community School District. The Gilbert Community Schools consists of Gilbert Elementary, Gilbert Intermediate School, the Gilbert Middle School, and Gilbert High School. The grade structure is a K-2, 3–5, 6–8, and 9-12 system.

Infrastructure

Transportation 
The main east–west road through Gilbert is county highway E23. A Union Pacific rail line goes north and south through the city.

References

External links 
 
  
City-Data Comprehensive Statistical Data and more about Gilbert

Cities in Iowa
Cities in Story County, Iowa